In the mathematical theory of probability, the Ionescu-Tulcea theorem, sometimes called the Ionesco Tulcea extension theorem deals with the existence of probability measures for probabilistic events consisting of a countably infinite number of individual probabilistic events. In particular, the individual events may be independent or dependent with respect to each other. Thus, the statement goes beyond the mere existence of countable product measures. The theorem was proved by Cassius Ionescu-Tulcea in 1949.

Statement of the theorem
For each  let

Then there exists a sequence of probability measures
 defined on the product space for the sequence , 

(The measure  has conditional probabilities equal to the stochastic kernels.)

Applications
The construction used in the proof of the Ionescu-Tulcea theorem is often used in the theory of Markov decision processes, and, in particular, the theory of Markov chains.

See also
 Disintegration theorem
 Regular conditional probability

Sources

References

Markov processes
Stochastic processes